The Borderlands, released in the United States as Final Prayer, is a 2013 British found footage horror film and the feature film directorial debut of Elliot Goldner, who also wrote the movie's script. It had its world premiere on 24 August 2013 at the London FrightFest Film Festival and centers upon a group of Vatican investigators researching an old church rumored to be the site of a miracle.

Plot

Three men – Deacon, a skeptical religious brother, Gray Parker, an English layman and technology expert, and the stringent Father Mark Amidon – are sent by the Vatican to investigate reports of supernatural activity in an old, recently reopened, thirteenth century church located in the Devon countryside.

Upon their first visit to the church, local priest Father Crellick tells them a miracle has taken place while Gray sets up the recording equipment. Crellick shows them footage of objects on the altar mysteriously moving but Deacon remains skeptical. That night, local youths burn a sheep to death outside the men's cottage. The next day, Mark discovers a hidden side panel in the church but he is disturbed by an unseen force before he can enter. Amidon ear suddenly starts bleeding however he states it is most likely a ruptured eardrum due to changes in air pressure during his flight to the location. A multi-mic radio setup detects the sound of deep growls and whispers, followed by the sound of an infant crying. While the three try to trace the source of the sounds, Deacon sees Crellick pass by a window. Mark pursues a despondent Crellick up the bell tower to the roof where Crellick questions whether he has witnessed a miracle or something far worse – he leaps to his death before a horrified Mark. Amidon insists on closing the investigation after this, citing that no concrete evidence of supernatural activity has be found.

Deacon and Gray visit the local pub and are met with hostility after Crellick’s passing. The local pub landlord evicts them from his premises after overhearing the two men discussing local folklore and their investigation. Deacon leaves the pub and goes investigate to church on his own. He traces whispers and creaks to a hidden door, inscribed with a pagan sigil he has seen in the diaries of the last minister to serve at the church until it was closed in the 1880s. Behind the door, a set of stairs leads down into darkness and Deacon is assailed by the sounds of a baby crying and Crellick screaming. 

Without consulting Amidon, Deacon requests his elderly mentor from the Vatican, exorcist Father Calvino to urgently visit and purify the church grounds. Calvino explains that during the founding of Christianity in England, priests built churches upon the sites of pagan temples. He has evidence that the church is situated on a site – still visible in aerial photographs – of human sacrifices to an unnamed pagan deity. That night, during the exorcism, violent and invisible forces shake the church. Mark is apparently killed and Calvino's eyes bleed then the two men mysteriously vanish. Deacon traces distant cries to the hidden staircase. As Gray and Deacon descend into a subterranean labyrinth, they find evidence of child sacrifice and realize that the former minister had converted to worshipping the pagan deity. They spot Mark who walks into the darkness heedless of their calls. The pair find Calvino's ornamental crucifix on the floor of one of the tunnels. Following the sound of Mark's voice, they crawl through a narrow, foul-smelling passageway whose exits suddenly contract via a membranous material before the tunnel itself begins to move, revealing it to be part of the digestive system of a living organism. The walls start to secrete powerful enzymes that begin to dissolve the two men. As their lights go out, Gray screams in agony and terror while a tormented Deacon recites the Lord's Prayer.

Cast
Gordon Kennedy as Brother Deacon 
Robin Hill as Gray Parker
Aidan McArdle as Father Mark Amidon
Patrick Godfrey as Father Calvino
Luke Neal as Father Crellick

Reception
Critical reception for The Borderlands has been predominantly positive and the film holds a rating of 82% on Rotten Tomatoes, based on 17 reviews. Common elements of praise centred upon the acting and the interactions between Gordon Kennedy and Robin Hill's characters, and Radio Times commented that "It's the pair's easy-going chemistry that firmly anchors this slow-burning shocker, whose rural setting deliberately evokes The Wicker Man". Time Out London and The Hollywood Reporter both gave mixed reviews for the film, and The Hollywood Reporter wrote that it has "plenty of chilling atmosphere but lacks bite".

References

External links
 
 

2013 films
2013 horror films
2010s supernatural horror films
British supernatural horror films
Folk horror films
2010s English-language films
Films set in 2013
Films set in Devon
Films shot in Scotland
Found footage films
2010s British films